{{DISPLAYTITLE:C23H21N7O}}
The molecular formula C23H21N7O may refer to:

 Entospletinib, an experimental drug, an inhibitor of spleen tyrosine kinase
 Tasosartan, an angiotensin II receptor antagonist

Molecular formulas